Rolando Pušnik (born 13 December 1961) is a Slovenian former handball player.

Club career
Over the course of his career that spanned over 25 years, Pušnik played for Celje (two spells), Crvenka, Železničar Niš, Mepamsa San Antonio, Zagreb (two spells), Prevent Slovenj Gradec, Slovan, Metković, SG Handball West Wien, Trimo Trebnje, and Padova. He won back-to-back European Cup titles with Zagreb in 1992 and 1993.

International career
At international level, Pušnik competed for Yugoslavia in two Olympic Games, winning the gold medal in 1984 and the bronze medal in 1988. He was also a member of the team that won the 1986 World Championship.

After the breakup of Yugoslavia, Pušnik represented Slovenia in four European Championships (1994, 1996, 2000 and 2002). He also participated in the 1995 World Championship and in the 2000 Summer Olympics.

Honours
Zagreb
 European Cup: 1991–92, 1992–93
Metković
 EHF Cup: 1999–2000

References

External links
 
 
 

1961 births
Living people
Sportspeople from Celje
Slovenian male handball players
Yugoslav male handball players
Olympic handball players of Yugoslavia
Olympic gold medalists for Yugoslavia
Olympic bronze medalists for Yugoslavia
Handball players at the 1984 Summer Olympics
Handball players at the 1988 Summer Olympics
Olympic medalists in handball
Medalists at the 1984 Summer Olympics
Medalists at the 1988 Summer Olympics
Olympic handball players of Slovenia
Handball players at the 2000 Summer Olympics
Competitors at the 1993 Mediterranean Games
Mediterranean Games medalists in handball
Mediterranean Games bronze medalists for Slovenia
RK Crvenka players
SDC San Antonio players
RK Zagreb players
Liga ASOBAL players
Expatriate handball players
Yugoslav expatriate sportspeople in Spain
Slovenian expatriate sportspeople in Croatia
Slovenian expatriate sportspeople in Austria
Slovenian expatriate sportspeople in Italy